The 2018 Portland Timbers 2 season is the 4th season for Portland Timbers 2 in United Soccer League (USL), the second-tier professional soccer league in the United States and Canada.

Club

Competitions

Preseason

Regular season

Postseason

Friendlies

References

2018 USL season
Portland Timbers 2
Portland Timbers 2
Portland Timbers 2 seasons